Birchington West ward was a ward of Thanet Borough Council in Kent, England, and was created in the boundary changes of 1979, and had previously been part of the Margate Birchington ward.

Councillors Hudson and Bentley transferred from Margate Birchington ward and contested and won the 1979 election.

1979 Election

1983 Election

1987 Election

1991 Election

1995 Election

1999 Election

There were boundary changes in May 2001 and this resulted in Birchington West, losing voters south of the London to Margate railway line (they were transferred to what became Birchington South ward), and acquiring voters which had been in Birchington East ward which had been north of the railway line. The ward was then renamed Birchington North.

Thanet